United Nations Security Council resolution 2311 was adopted in 2016, having considered the question of the recommendation for the appointment of the Secretary-General of the United Nations, the Council recommended to the General Assembly that Mr. António Guterres be appointed for a term of office from January 1, 2017, to December 31, 2021.

See also
 List of United Nations Security Council Resolutions 2301 to 2400 (2016–2018)

References

External links
Text of the Resolution at undocs.org

 2311
 2311
October 2016 events